
Spelthorne College was a single-campus sixth form college on High Street, Ashford, Surrey, England. It was formed in 1975 as a successor to Ashford Sixth Form College and Sunbury Sixth Form College. Its campus was founded in 1911 as Ashford County Grammar School, which became a sixth form college in 1975. In 2007 Spelthorne College merged with Brooklands College in Weybridge.

Former school
Middlesex County Council founded the school in 1911 as Ashford County Grammar School, funded  by the combined county and district local rates collected by Staines Rural District Council (RDC). It taught children of secondary school age from 11 to 18.

In 1965 Middlesex County Council was dissolved and Ashford was made part of Surrey. The school continued as a grammar school until 1972 when Surrey County Council transferred the school's 11- to 15-year-old pupils to other schools and turned Ashford County Grammar into Ashford Sixth Form College. In 1974 Staines RDC was dissolved and its area became part of the new Spelthorne Borough Council (SBC). In 1975 the college absorbed pupils and staff from Sunbury Sixth Form College and was renamed Spelthorne College.

Spelthorne College's archive is lodged with Spelthorne Museum.

Merger
As the college provided education in England and Wales to children more than 16 years old, in 1992 its funding passed to the Further Education Funding Council for England, later replaced by the Learning and Skills Council. The college performed well in external reviews, for instance gaining 23–24 points in the Quality Assurance Agency for Higher Education's (QAA) review of its higher education provision in business studies.

Brooklands College

A Strategic Area Review in 2004 by the Learning Skills Council recommended that to expand and modernise the college's premises it merge with a larger institution. On 1 August 2007 the merger with Brooklands College was completed, to operate as the Ashford Campus, the other campus being the Brooklands College's Weybridge campus.

Redevelopment
On 8 February 2017 SBC refused planning permission to redevelop the site as shops, a public square and 366 homes in buildings ranging from one to six storeys high. Inland Homes disregarded the decision and on 20 February started demolishing the buildings. SBC issued an order to stop, and demolition ceased on 21 February. As of April 2017 the building remained partly demolished pending resolution of the dispute.

Alumni

Ashford County Grammar School, Sunbury and Ashford Sixth Form Colleges and Spelthorne College:
 Don Bennett, who played cricket for Middlesex 1950–68
 Nicholas Bond-Owen, child actor of the 1970s and '80s who played Tristram Fourmile in the sitcom George and Mildred
 Brian Capron, actor in Coronation Street from the Sunbury Sixth Form College
 Susannah Clapp, theatre critic of The Observer since 1997
 Robert Evans, MEP for London North West 1994–99 and one of the MEPs for London 1999–2009
 Richard Johnson, who played cricket for Middlesex and England 1992–2007
 Gary Numan, musician
 Arthur Palmer, MP for Wimbledon 1945–50, Cleveland 1952–59, Bristol Central 1964–74, and Bristol North East 1974–83
 Sid Russell (1937–94), who played cricket for Middlesex (1960–64) and Gloucestershire (1965–68) and football for Brentford F.C. 1956–61
 Wendy Smith-Sly, Olympic athlete who competed mainly in 3000 metres running events
 Irene Thomas, radio quiz show personality
 Norman Willis, TUC General Secretary 1984–93

References

External links
Spelthorne Museum
Capital Bid Minutes

Ashford, Surrey
Educational institutions disestablished in 2007
Educational institutions established in 1911
Further education colleges in Surrey
People educated at Ashford County Grammar School
1911 establishments in England